Lipschitzallee is a Berlin U-Bahn station located on the .
This station was opened in 1970 (architect Rümmler) and was planned to be named Heroldweg. However it was named Lipschitzallee (after the SPD politician Lipschitz). The next station is Wutzykallee.

References

U7 (Berlin U-Bahn) stations
Buildings and structures in Neukölln
Railway stations in Germany opened in 1970